Douglas Carter Beane is an American playwright and screenwriter. Born in Wilkes-Barre, Pennsylvania and raised in Wyomissing, Pennsylvania, Beane now lives in New York. His works include the screenplay of To Wong Foo, Thanks for Everything! Julie Newmar, and several plays including The Country Club and The Little Dog Laughed, which was nominated for the 2007 Tony Award for Best Play and As Bees in Honey Drown, which ran at New York's Lucille Lortel Theatre in 1997.  Beane often writes works with sophisticated, "drawing room" humor.

Theatre
Beane wrote the book for Xanadu, a stage musical adaptation of the 1980 film of the same name, adding new plot twists and humor parodying the original movie. The musical was workshopped in 2006 and early 2007 with director Christopher Ashley and actors Jane Krakowski, Tony Roberts, and Cheyenne Jackson.  The musical opened on Broadway at the Helen Hayes Theatre on July 10, 2007, with a budget of $5 million. Kerry Butler and Cheyenne Jackson were the Broadway leads. Beane won the Drama Desk Award for Outstanding Book of a Musical and was nominated for the Tony Award for Best Book of a Musical.

In 2011, Beane was hired to "doctor" the book for the musical Sister Act 
 alongside Bill and Cheri Steinkellner for which he was nominated for a Tony Award, Best Book of a Musical.

Beane wrote the book for the musical Lysistrata Jones and rewrote the book for a new adaptation of Rodgers and Hammerstein's Cinderella which opened on Broadway in 2013. Also opening in 2013 was his new play for Lincoln Center, The Nance, starring Nathan Lane and directed by Jack O'Brien. Beane has revised the libretto for the Metropolitan Opera's new production of the operetta Die Fledermaus which was performed in 2013- 2014.

Beane is the artistic director of the Drama Dept. Theater Company in New York.

Beane trained as an actor, graduating from the American Academy of Dramatic Arts New York campus in 1980. He is very involved with his alma mater, workshopping new pieces with the students.

Personal life
Beane is married to his frequent collaborator, composer Lewis Flinn, and the two are parents to two adopted children, Cooper and Gabrielle.

Selected works

Broadway
 2013 The Nance
 2013 Rodgers and Hammerstein's Cinderella
 2011 Lysistrata Jones 
 2011 Sister Act
 2007 Xanadu
 2006 The Little Dog Laughed

Off-Broadway
 2019 The Big Time - Book by Beane, Music and Lyrics by Douglas J. Cohen
2015 Shows for Days
 2010 Mr. & Mrs. Fitch
 2006 The Little Dog Laughed
 2001 Music from a Sparkling Planet
 1999 The Country Club
 1997 As Bees In Honey Drown
 1996 Advice From a Caterpillar

Film
 1995 To Wong Foo, Thanks for Everything! Julie Newmar

References

External links
 
 
 
 The Little Dog Laughed official website 
 Douglas Carter Beane interviewed in The Playwright Working in the Theatre CUNY-TV/American Theatre Wing, December 2006
 BroadwayWorld.com interview with Douglas Carter Beane, June 5, 2007

Year of birth missing (living people)
Living people
Writers from Wilkes-Barre, Pennsylvania
American male dramatists and playwrights
American male screenwriters
People from Wyomissing, Pennsylvania
People from Berks County, Pennsylvania
American gay writers
American LGBT screenwriters
American LGBT dramatists and playwrights
Writers from New York City
LGBT people from Pennsylvania
LGBT people from New York (state)
Gay screenwriters
Gay dramatists and playwrights
21st-century American LGBT people